Voyage Trekkers is an American comedy web series created by director Nathan Blackwell and co-writer Craig Michael Curtis. The series is broadcast on the internet and premiered on 9 July 2011. The webseries spanned 2 seasons and in 2018 a TV episode was released. The show can be found distributed across the web including on Blip and YouTube. Voyage Trekkers is a comedy web series about a hopeless starship crew in the Galactic Union and has been described as a successful parody of sci-fi shows such as Star Trek or by its director as a 'love letter to sci-fi situations and genre conventions'. Led by the charismatic but self-centered Captain Sunstrike (Adam Rini), with the help of the apathetic first officer Commander Powell (Logan Blackwell), and the exasperated Doctor Rena (Gabrielle Van Buren), they seek to climb their way up the space adventure ladder.

History 
The series was inspired by director Nathan Blackwell and co-writer Craig Michael Curtis.  Nathan graduated from South Mountain High School in Phoenix in TV & Communications, and then attended Scottsdale Community College's Film Production, where he made his feature film debut with "Forever Midnight".  His second feature film 'no budget' was adapted from the award-winning play written by his brother, Logan Blackwell, "The Constant Epiphanies of Billy The Blood Donor."  Nathan Blackwell commented, 'Voyage Trekkers came about out of the sheer desire to make something fun. I was balancing several projects at the time, and for whatever reason, I needed to make something that tapped into that childhood energy of when I first picked up a movie camera and made stories about aliens and ray guns.'  The second season was funded by an Indiegogo campaign raising $4,056, just over their original target of $4,000 total.

Season 1

Season 2

References

External links 
 
 Voyage Trekkers on Blip

2011 web series debuts
American comedy web series
American science fiction web series